The 1965 Cotton Bowl Classic was the 29th edition of the college football bowl game, played at the Cotton Bowl in Dallas, Texas, on Friday, January 1. With national championship implications, the game matched the Southwest Conference champion Arkansas Razorbacks and the Nebraska Cornhuskers, champions of the Big Eight Conference.

Second-ranked Arkansas rallied to defeat #6 Nebraska 10–7 in front of 75,504 to win their first Cotton Bowl and claim to a first national title.

Setting

Arkansas

The Razorbacks stormed into Dallas after winning all ten of its games to earn the Southwest Conference title and a #2 ranking in the AP and Coaches polls. The Hogs defeated #1 Texas 14–13 in Austin to clinch the bowl berth, and the conference championship. Longhorn head coach Darrell Royal went for two in the game and failed, giving the game, conference, bowl bid, and later the national crown to the Razorbacks.

Razorback guard Ronnie Caveness was named an All-American. Ken Hatfield again led the nation in punt return yards, with 518. Tom McKnelly scored 45 points kicking 27 extra points and 6 field goals, which tied him with LSU's Doug Moreau for fourth place nationally.

Arkansas entered the bowl season on a sour note, with losses in major bowl games in January 1961, 1962, and 1963; they didn't play in a bowl the previous season due to their 5–5 record.

Nebraska

Under third-year head coach Bob Devaney, Nebraska won its first nine games and was fourth in the rankings, but lost 17–7 at rival Oklahoma on November 21, which snapped a sixteen-game winning streak. The Huskers' previous bowl trips were split at 2–2, with both wins in the last two seasons.

Game summary
This was the first-ever meeting between the two programs. Arkansas' number-one rated defense was giving up only 5.7 points per game, while Nebraska's #7 offense was scoring 24.9 points per contest.

A standing room only crowd watched as Arkansas opened the scoring on a Tom McKnelly field goal in the first quarter. Nebraska responded in the second, with Harry Wilson punching it into the end zone from one yard out for a touchdown, giving the Huskers a 7–3 lead at halftime.

The third quarter passed with no scoring. Fred Marshall took over at quarterback for the Razorbacks in the fourth quarter and engineered an 80-yard drive with little time left on the game clock. Marshall pitched to running back Bobby Burnett, who scampered in from the three-yard line for the game's final touchdown, giving Arkansas a 10-7 victory. It was their first win in a major bowl and their first bowl win in four years.

Aftermath
The Razorbacks were selected as national champions by the Football Writers Association of America and the Helms Athletic Foundation, after the Alabama Crimson Tide lost their bowl game against the Texas Longhorns in the Orange Bowl. Arkansas defeated Texas in Austin earlier in the season. Because the final major polls (AP and Coaches (UPI)) were released in early December before bowl games were played, the Crimson Tide was selected national champions. Because of the controversy, the AP Poll decided to wait until after the bowl games to select their champion in the 1965 season. Nebraska entered the game sixth in the final AP poll, while Arkansas was second.

Jerry Jones, the Arkansas co-captain, went on to build AT&T Stadium in suburban Arlington, where the Cotton Bowl Classic is now played.

Ken Hatfield of Arkansas returned to the Cotton Bowl Classic in January 1989 
as the Razorbacks' head coach; Arkansas was defeated  by UCLA (quarterbacked by Troy Aikman whom Jones signed for the Dallas Cowboys.)

References

Cotton Bowl Classic
Cotton Bowl Classic
Arkansas Razorbacks football bowl games
Nebraska Cornhuskers football bowl games
Cotton Bowl
January 1965 sports events in the United States